The  is a  botanical garden and arboretum located at 186 Kanazu, Akiha-ku, Niigata, Niigata, Japan. It is open daily except Mondays; an admission fee is charged.

The garden contains a collection of cherry trees, including Prunus x yedoensis, Prunus jamasakura, Prunus subhirtella Miq., and Prunus lannesiana; a conifer arboretum containing some 300 varieties from Europe and North America; another small arboretum, primarily cherry trees and conifers, given by the prefecture's towns and cities; and a collection of aromatic herbs (about 150 species).

The garden also contains substantial greenhouses including a large dome (30 meters tall, 42 meters in diameter), with about 550 species total in arid, aquatic, and tropical zones.

See also 
 List of botanical gardens in Japan

References 
 Niigata Prefectural Botanical Garden (Japanese)
 Niigata Prefecture description
 Jardins Botaniques Japonais (French)

Arboreta in Japan
Botanical gardens in Japan
Gardens in Niigata Prefecture
Greenhouses in Japan